Anic or ANIC may refer to:

Organisations
 African Network Information Center, the regional Internet registry for Africa
 The Anglican Network in Canada, a diocese of the Anglican Church in North America
 Australian National Insect Collection, a division of the CSIRO
 Azienda Nazionale Idrogenazione Combustibili, a former Italian chemical company (1936–1953)

Other uses
 Anić, a surname
 "A.N.I.C.", a song on the album Does This Look Infected? by Sum 41